The 1998–99 Colorado Avalanche season was the Avalanche's fourth season and last season at McNichols Sports Arena. They would move to the Pepsi Center during the off-season.

Regular season
April 3, 1999: In a victory over the Edmonton Oilers, Patrick Roy passed Glenn Hall with his 408th victory.

Season standings

Schedule and results

Playoffs

Western Conference Quarterfinals: (2) Colorado Avalanche vs. (7) San Jose Sharks

Western Conference Semifinals: (2) Colorado Avalanche vs. (3) Detroit Red Wings

Western Conference Finals: (1) Dallas Stars vs. (2) Colorado Avalanche

Player statistics

Awards and records

Transactions

Draft picks
Colorado's draft picks at the 1998 NHL Entry Draft held at the Marine Midland Arena in Buffalo, New York.

See also
1998–99 NHL season

References
 
 
 
 
Notes

General

The Internet Hockey Database
Colorado Avalanche Database
Official National Hockey League Site

1998–99 NHL season by team
1998–99 in American ice hockey by team
1998-99
Colorado
Colorado